Pseudotriccus is a genus of birds in the tyrant flycatcher family Tyrannidae. They are found in the undergrowth of Andean forests.

Species
It contains three species:

References

 
Bird genera
 
Taxonomy articles created by Polbot